Richard de Stoke was the member of Parliament for Coventry in 1353. He was also several times mayor of the city.

References 

Members of the Parliament of England for Coventry
English MPs 1353
Year of birth missing
Year of death missing
Mayors of Coventry